Thotada is a village in Munagapaka mandal Anakapalle, Andhra Pradesh.

References

Villages in Anakapalli  district